Hill Spring is a village in southern Alberta, Canada.

History 
Hill Spring was founded in 1910 by Church of Jesus Christ of Latter-day Saints leader Edward J. Wood.

Demographics 

In the 2016 Census of Population conducted by Statistics Canada, the Village of Hill Spring recorded a population of 162 living in 74 of its 92 total private dwellings, a  change from its 2011 population of 186.

Notable people 
Nathan Eldon Tanner, who served in the Alberta Legislature and the First Presidency of the Church of Jesus Christ of Latter-day Saints, lived and taught school in Hill Spring.

See also 
Latter-day Saint settlements in Canada
List of communities in Alberta
List of villages in Alberta

References

External links 

1961 establishments in Alberta
Cardston County
Latter-day Saint settlements in Canada
Populated places established in 1910
Villages in Alberta